"Step Into the Music" is the debut and only single by Australian group, Dogma. The was released in late 2002 and peaked at number 49 on the ARIA charts.

Track listings
 "Step Into the Music" (Radio Edit) - 3:46
 "Step Into the Music" (Prize Money Dub Mix) - 6:03
 "Step Into the Music" (Carlos Sanchez House Mix) - 8:49
 "Step Into the Music" (Original Extended)	- 5:19

Charts

References

2002 singles
2002 songs